Svinedrengen og prinsessen på ærten (literally The Swineherd and the Princess on the Pea) is a 1962 Danish animated film directed by Poul Ilsøe and starring Dirch Passer. It is based on the tales, respectively "The Swineherd" and "The Princess and the Pea", by Hans Christian Andersen.

Cast
 Dirch Passer as  voice
 Henning Moritzen as  voice
 Lise Ringheim as  voice
 Johannes Meyer as  voice
 Bjørn Spiro as  voice
 Knud Hilding as  voice
 Ellen Margrethe Stein as  voice

References

External links

1962 films
1962 animated films
Danish animated films
1960s Danish-language films
Films based on works by Hans Christian Andersen
Works based on The Princess and the Pea
Films based on fairy tales